Microhelia is a genus of moths of the family Noctuidae.

Species
The genus includes the following species:

 Microhelia angelica (Smith, 1900)

References
 Natural History Museum Lepidoptera genus database
 Microhelia at funet

Heliothinae